Silvestre Savitsky (10 January 1894—1954) was a Colombian-born Russian communist and freemason. He played a leading role in introduction Communism in Colombia, laying the foundations for the Communist International in Colombia. Having served in the Red Army in the aftermath of the October Revolution during the Russian Civil War, he returned to Latin America in the 1920s. He announced the creation of the Comité Organizador del Partido Comunista de Colombia in May 1924, the first explicitly communist party in Colombia. In the lead-up to the unrest that culminated in Banana Massacre, he was expelled from Colombia for "agitating the practise of doctrines subversive to the social order." After this time he lived in exile in Mexico from 1925. A freemason from his teenage years, he set up Masonic Lodges under the Gran Logia Independiente Mexicana (which later merged with the Gran Logia Valle de México in the 1940s).

Biography
Silvestre Savitsky was born in Cali, Colombia on 10 January 1894) to Onofre Savitsky and his wife Irene Drozdovich Contreras. His parents married in 1890. Savitsky's father was born in the Ukraine, then part of the Russian Empire. He was an engineer, part of the technical team working under Ferdinand Lesseps who went to Latin America to try and construct the Panama Canal, linking the Atlantic Ocean and the Pacific Ocean. It is during this time that Savitsky's parents met; his mother was born in Colombia, but herself had a Russian-born father as well. It is unclear if his family were ethnically Jewish, Russian or Ukrainian. The climate was radically different in Colombia compared to Russia, with malaria effecting his father, the Savitskys returned to the Ukraine for health reasons.

Savitsky arrived in Ukraine as a baby and grew up with his well-off grandparents. He grew up bi-lingual, learning the Russian language and the Spanish language. From an early age he became hostile to the Tsarist monarchy and the Russian Orthodox Church.

Savitsky was a student in Moscow, when the Soviet government sent him to China to purchase foodgrains. However, Savitsky lost the money handed to him by the government playing roulette, and found himself in a position of not being able to return to Russia. He fled to Tokyo, and then to Panama, before finally arriving in Colombia. He settled down in Colombia, and began propagating Bolshevik ideas there. Around him a circle of followers emerged, including José del Mar, Gabriel Turbay and Luis Tejada. The group maintained contacts with the Socialist Party, but retained a separate political identity. Savitsky assisted the May 1, 1924, conference of the Socialist Party, which pledged to follow the 21 theses of the Communist International.

His partner was Isabel Yacunine.

References

External links
 "Un Ruso de oscuro pasado" by Francmasneria Progresista Universal
 1928: The Santa Marta Massacre at LibCom
 KOMINTERN Y AMÉRICA LATINA. EN DOCUMENTOS DEL ARCHIVO DE MOSCÚ
 América Latina en la Internacional Comunista 1919-1943

1894 births
1954 deaths
Comintern people
People from Cali
Colombian communists
Colombian Freemasons
Colombian people of Ukrainian-Jewish descent
Russian Freemasons
Anti-revisionists